Susan Crobaugh (August 27, 1925 - May 14, 2009), better known as Susan Willis, was an American actress.

Willis was born in Tiffin, Ohio, and she was a 1947 graduate of the Carnegie Tech Drama School. She acted in community theater while she was a student.

Willis's Broadway credits included Oliver! (1984), Come Live With Me (1967), Cabaret (1966), and Dylan (1964).

She was married to Kirk Willis, a stage director. She died in New York City.

Filmography

References

External links

1925 births
2009 deaths
American actresses
20th-century American women
21st-century American women